The discography of American recording artist Rich Homie Quan consists of one studio album, two extended play, nine mixtapes and twenty-three singles (in addition to twelve as a featured artist).

Albums

Studio albums

Mixtapes

Extended plays

Singles

As lead artist

As featured artist

Other charted songs

Guest appearances

Notes

References

Discography
Discographies of American artists
Hip hop discographies